The ASM-A-1 Tarzon, also known as VB-13, was a guided bomb developed by the United States Army Air Forces during the late 1940s. Mating the guidance system of the earlier Razon radio-controlled weapon with a British Tallboy  bomb, the ASM-A-1 saw brief operational service in the Korean War before being withdrawn from service in 1951.

Design and development
Development of the VB-13 Tarzon began in February 1945, with Bell Aircraft being awarded a contract by the United States Army Air Forces for the development of a very large guided bomb. The VB-13 was a combination of a radio-command guidance system as used on the smaller VB-3 Razon ('Range And azimuth only') guided bomb with the British-developed Tallboy  "earthquake" bomb, known to the USAAF as M112. The 'Tarzon' name was a portmanteau, combining Tallboy, range and azimuth only, describing the weapon and guidance system; and was pronounced similarly to that of "Tarzan", the popular "ape-man" fictional character.

The VB-13, redesignated ASM-A-1 in 1948, was developed under the project code MX-674. It had an annular wing around the midsection of its body, mounted near the weapon's center of gravity. At the rear of the bomb was an octagonal tail surface containing the Razon control surfaces. Intended to be carried by the Boeing B-29 Superfortress bomber, the Tarzon bomb used the combination of AN/ARW-38 [Joint Army Navy, Piloted Aircraft, Radio, Automatic Flight or Remote Control] command link transmitter on the B-29 and an AN/URW-2 [Joint Army Navy, Utility, Radio, Automatic Flight or Remote Control] receiver on the Tarzon to provide manual command guidance of range and azimuth. This was done with visual tracking of the bomb's course, aided by a flare mounted in the tail of the weapon. Gyroscopes on board the ASM-A-1 aided in stabilisation, while a pneumatic system drove the bomb's control surfaces.

In addition to the  nominal weight of the Tallboy it was based on, the annular wing and control surfaces boosted the weight of Tarzon by an additional . This made the ASM-A-1 too large and heavy to fit inside the bomb bay of a Superfortress; instead, the weapon was carried in a semi-recessed mounting, half the weapon being exposed to the airstream. This increased drag on the carrying aircraft, and caused turbulent airflow that could affect the handling of the B-29.

Operational history

Although the VB-13 project had not reached the testing stage by the end of World War II, it avoided being cancelled, proceeding as a low-priority project. Limited testing was conducted during 1948 and 1949; additional testing at Alamogordo, New Mexico in 1950 led to the Tarzon being approved for operational service in the Korean War.

Tarzon saw its first combat use in December 1950, the ASM-A-1 replacing the Razon in operational service; the smaller weapon had been determined to be too small for effective use against bridges and other hardened targets. Used solely by the 19th Bomb Group, which had previously conducted the Razon's combat missions, the first Tarzon drop in combat took place on December 14, 1950.

The largest bomb used in combat during the war, Tarzon was used in strikes against North Korean bridges and other hardened targets, the Tarzon's improved accuracy over conventional 'dumb bombs' led to the confirmed destruction of at least six high-priority targets during approximately six months of combat use; these included a hydroelectric plant, proving the effectiveness of guided weapons against conventional targets as well as bridges.

Thirty Tarzon missions were flown between December 1950 and March 1951; the weapon's success led to a contract for the production of 1,000 additional ASM-A-1 missiles. On March 29, 1951, however, a Tarzon strike against Sinuiju went awry; the group commander's aircraft was destroyed as a result of the premature detonation of the bomb when, the aircraft suffering mechanical difficulties, the weapon was jettisoned in preparation for ditching. The thirtieth, and as it proved final, mission, three weeks following the Sinuiju mission, also suffered an unintentional detonation of a jettisoned, "safed" bomb, although this time without the loss of the aircraft.

An investigation proved that the fault lay in the construction of the bomb's tail; breaking up on impact, a 'safed' bomb would have its arming wire removed, rendering it 'unsafe' and detonating the weapon. Modifications were made to solve the problem, but the damage had been done; the safety issues, increased maintenance costs compared to conventional bombs, the fact that the bomb's guidance system required clear-day use only, rendering the bombers vulnerable to enemy fighters, and required that the weapon be released at a prime altitude for the aircraft to be in danger from enemy flak. These combined with the weapon's poor reliability – only six of twenty-eight bombs dropped successfully destroyed their targets – to result in the production order being canceled by the USAF; following this, the Tarzon program as a whole was terminated in August 1951.

See also
Azon
Bat (guided bomb)
Fritz X
Grand Slam (bomb)
 Tallboy (bomb)

References

Notes

Citations

Bibliography

External links

Weapons and ammunition introduced in 1949
Guided bombs of the United States
Bell aircraft